Santa Bárbara, with a population of 28,750 (2020 calculation), is the capital city of the Santa Bárbara Department of Honduras and the municipal seat of Santa Bárbara Municipality.

Demographics
At the time of the 2013 Honduras census, Santa Bárbara municipality had a population of 41,736. Of these, 72.45% were Mestizo, 22.00% White, 2.41% Indigenous (2.01% Lenca, 0.29% Chʼortiʼ), 1.50% Black or Afro-Honduran and 1.64% others.

Health
The Santa Bárbara Hospital is located in the North Quarter of the city. Since 1957 it has served people from both the Santa Bárbara Department and the department of Lempira.

Food
Typical foods of the region are chilate, ticuco, atol of corn, chicken and pork tamales, yucca with chicharrón, torrejas, and horchata.

Economy
This city is known for crafts and the cultivation of coffee. The local economy depends mostly on these traditional activities.

Villages
The Santa Bárbara municipality has the following villages:

Notable people
Saturnino Bográn Bonilla (es), born in Yuscarán, grew up in the city of Santa Bárbara, was deputy and Secretary in the Directory of the National Congress in 1846–1847, Minister of Finance and War 1867.
General Luis Bográn (es), President of Honduras from 1883 to 1891, an important figure in the Liberal Reformation.
Doctor Francisco Bográn Barahona (es), President of Honduras 1919 to 1920.
Edmond L. Bográn, leader in the financial area, proprietary partner of the newspaper El Tiempo (Honduras) (es).
Lawyer José Efraín Bú Girón, President of the National Congress and Minister in the 1980s.
María José Alvarado (es), Miss Honduras World 2014.
José Ramón Madrid Padilla, mathematician.

References 

Municipalities of the Santa Bárbara Department, Honduras